The Seram golden bulbul (Hypsipetes affinis) is a species of songbird in the family Pycnonotidae. It is endemic to the Moluccas. Until recently, it was considered conspecific with the northern golden bulbul and the Buru golden bulbul. Its natural habitat is subtropical or tropical moist lowland forests.

Taxonomy and systematics
The Seram golden bulbul was originally classified in the genus Criniger, and has also been classified in the genera  Hypsipetes, Ixos, and Alophoixus. Alternate names for the Seram golden bulbul include the golden bulbul and Moluccan bulbul.

Subspecies
Two subspecies are currently recognized:
 H. a. affinis - (Hombron & Jacquinot, 1841): Found on Seram
 Ambon golden bulbul (H. a. flavicaudus) - (Bonaparte, 1850): Originally described as a separate species in the genus Trichophorus (a synonym for Criniger). Found on Ambon Island

References

Rheindt, F.E., and R.O. Hutchinson. 2007. A photoshot odyssey through the confused avian taxonomy of Seram and Buru (southern Moluccas). BirdingASIA 7: 18–38.

Seram golden bulbul
Birds of Seram
Endemic fauna of Seram Island
Seram golden bulbul
Seram golden bulbul
Seram golden bulbul
Taxonomy articles created by Polbot